Adams County is a county located in the U.S. state of Nebraska. As of the 2020 United States Census, the population was 31,205. Its county seat is Hastings. The county was formed in 1867 and organized in 1871. It is named for John Adams, the second President of the United States.

Adams County comprises the Hastings, NE Micropolitan Statistical Area.

In the Nebraska license plate system, Adams County is represented by the prefix 14 (it had the 14th-largest number of vehicles registered in the state when the license plate system was established in 1922).

Geography

Major highways

  U.S. Highway 6
  U.S. Highway 34
  U.S. Highway 281
  Nebraska Highway 74

Adjacent counties

 Hamilton County – northeast
 Clay County – east
 Webster County – south
 Kearney County – west
 Buffalo County – northwest
 Hall County – north

Demographics

As of the 2000 United States Census, there were 31,151 people, 12,141 households, and 7,964 families in the county. The population density was 55 people per square mile (21/km2). There were 13,014 housing units at an average density of 23 per square mile (9/km2). The racial makeup of the county was 94.54% White, 0.64% Black or African American, 0.36% Native American, 1.60% Asian, 0.04% Pacific Islander, 1.99% from other races, and 0.83% from two or more races. 4.58% of the population were Hispanic or Latino of any race. 45.6% were of German, 7.9% Irish, 7.7% English and 7.3% American ancestry according to Census 2000.

There were 12,141 households, out of which 30.90% had children under the age of 18 living with them, 54.40% were married couples living together, 8.30% had a female householder with no husband present, and 34.40% were non-families. 28.60% of all households were made up of individuals, and 13.00% had someone living alone who was 65 years of age or older. The average household size was 2.43 and the average family size was 3.00.

The county population included 24.40% under the age of 18, 11.90% from 18 to 24, 26.20% from 25 to 44, 21.70% from 45 to 64, and 15.90% who were 65 years of age or older. The median age was 36 years. For every 100 females, there were 96.10 males. For every 100 females age 18 and over, there were 92.80 males.

The median income for a household in the county was $37,160, and the median income for a family was $45,620. Males had a median income of $29,842 versus $21,236 for females. The per capita income for the county was $18,308. About 5.50% of families and 9.30% of the population were below the poverty line, including 10.40% of those under age 18 and 6.70% of those age 65 or over.

Politics
Adams County voters have been strongly Republican. In only three national elections since 1916 has the county selected the Democratic Party candidate, all in national landslide victories for the party.

Communities

City
 Hastings (county seat)

Villages

 Ayr
 Holstein
 Juniata
 Kenesaw
 Prosser
 Roseland
 Trumbull

Unincorporated communities

 Assumption
 Hansen
 Hayland
 Ingleside
 Pauline

Townships

 Ayr
 Blaine
 Cottonwood
 Denver
 Hanover
 Highland
 Juniata
 Kenesaw
 Little Blue
 Logan
 Roseland
 Silver Lake
 Verona
 Wanda
 West Blue
 Zero

See also
 National Register of Historic Places listings in Adams County, Nebraska

References

External links

 Adams County Website
 Adams County Historical Society
 Adams County Convention & Visitors Bureau

 
Nebraska counties
Hastings Micropolitan Statistical Area
1871 establishments in Nebraska